Earl Township is a township in Berks County, Pennsylvania. The population was 3,102 at the 2020 census. Earl Township was named for early German settler Hans Graaf. His surname Graaf means "earl" in English.

Geography
It is drained by the Schuylkill River mostly via the Manatawny Creek. Its villages include Earlville (also in Amity Township,) Shanesville, Woodchoppertown, and Worman.

Adjacent townships
Oley Township (west)
Pike Township (north)
Colebrookdale Township (east)
Douglass Township (southeast)
Amity Township (south)

Demographics

At the 2000 census, there were 3,050 people, 1,156 households, and 895 families living in the township.  The population density was 221.1 people per square mile (85.4/km).  There were 1,202 housing units at an average density of 87.1/sq mi (33.7/km).  The racial makeup of the township was 98.13% White, 0.72% African American, 0.10% Native American, 0.23% Asian, 0.03% Pacific Islander, 0.43% from other races, and 0.36% from two or more races. Hispanic or Latino of any race were 0.72%.

There were 1,156 households, 33.0% had children under the age of 18 living with them, 67.4% were married couples living together, 5.5% had a female householder with no husband present, and 22.5% were non-families. 18.5% of households were made up of individuals, and 6.4% were one person aged 65 or older.  The average household size was 2.63 and the average family size was 2.97.

The age distribution was 22.9% under the age of 18, 7.4% from 18 to 24, 31.4% from 25 to 44, 29.0% from 45 to 64, and 9.4% 65 or older.  The median age was 39 years. For every 100 females, there were 106.6 males.  For every 100 females age 18 and over, there were 105.7 males.

The median household income was $51,976 and the median family income  was $60,363. Males had a median income of $39,861 versus $26,125 for females. The per capita income for the township was $22,527.  About 1.3% of families and 3.7% of the population were below the poverty line, including 1.4% of those under age 18 and 13.1% of those age 65 or over.

Transportation

Pennsylvania Route 73 and Pennsylvania Route 562 are the two numbered highways serving the township. PA 73 follows Philadelphia Avenue along a northwest-southeast alignment across the northern part of the township, while PA 562 follows Boyertown Pike along an east-west alignment across the southern edge of the township.

References

External links

Townships in Berks County, Pennsylvania
Townships in Pennsylvania